The Locofocos (also Loco Focos or Loco-focos) were a faction of the Democratic Party in American politics that existed from 1835 until the mid-1840s.

History
The faction, originally named the Equal Rights Party, was created in New York City as a protest against that city's regular Democratic organization ("Tammany Hall"). It contained a mixture of anti-Tammany Democrats and labor union veterans of the Working Men's Party, the latter of which had existed from 1828 to 1830. They were vigorous advocates of laissez-faire and opponents of monopoly. Their leading intellectual was  editorial writer William Leggett.

The name "Locofoco" derived from "locofoco, a kind of friction match". It originated when a group of New York Jacksonians used such matches to light candles to continue a political meeting after Tammany men tried to break up the meeting by turning off the gaslights.

The Locofocos were involved in the Flour Riot of 1837.  In February 1837, the Locofocos held a mass meeting in City Hall Park (New York City) to protest the rising cost of living.  When the assembled crowd learned that flour had been hoarded at warehouses on the Lower East Side, hundreds rushed to the warehouses resulting in the arrest of 53 people.  The New York State Assembly blamed the Locofocos for the unrest and opened an investigation into them.

The Locofocos never controlled the party nationally and declined after 1840, when the federal government passed the Independent Treasury Act. This assured them that the government would not resume its involvement in banking, which had been a key aim of the faction. In the 1840 election, the term "Locofoco" was applied to the entire Democratic Party by its Whig opponents, both because Democratic President Martin Van Buren had incorporated many Locofoco ideas into his economic policy, and because Whigs considered the term to be derogatory.

In general, Locofocos supported Andrew Jackson and Van Buren, and were for free trade, greater circulation of specie, legal protections for labor unions and against paper money, financial speculation, and state banks. Among the prominent members of the faction were William Leggett, William Cullen Bryant, Alexander Ming Jr., John Commerford, Levi D. Slamm, Abram D. Smith, Henry K. Smith, Isaac S. Smith, Moses Jacques, Gorham Parks, and Walt Whitman (then a newspaper editor).

Ralph Waldo Emerson said of the Locofocos: "The new race is stiff, heady, and rebellious; they are fanatics in freedom; they hate tolls, taxes, turnpikes, banks, hierarchies, governors, yea, almost all laws."

Origin of name
The name Loco-foco was originally used by John Marck for a self-igniting cigar, which he had patented in April 1834. Marck, an immigrant, invented his name from a combination of the Latin prefix loco-, which as part of the word "locomotive" had recently entered general public use, and was usually misinterpreted to mean "self", and a misspelling of the Italian word fuoco for "fire". Therefore, Marck's name for his product was originally meant in the sense of "self-firing". It appears that Marck's term was quickly genericized to mean any self-igniting match, and it was this usage from which the faction derived its name.

The Whigs quickly seized upon the name, applying an alternate derivation of "Loco Foco", from the combination of the Spanish word loco, meaning mad or crack-brained, and "foco", from focus or fuego 'fire'. Their meaning then was that the faction and later the entire Democratic party, was the "focus of folly". The use of "Locofoco" as a derogatory name for the Democratic party continued well into the 1850s, even following the dissolution of the Whig Party and the formation of the Republican Party by former urban Workingmen Locofocos, anti-slavery Know Nothings, Free Soilers, Conscience Whigs, and Temperance Whigs.

In popular culture
 Fleshies recorded "Locofoco Motherfucker" on Kill The Dreamer's Dream (2001), which interpreted contemporary politics by reference to the locofoco movement.

See also
 Specie Circular
 Preserved Fish
 Young America Movement

References

Further reading
 
 Greenberg, Joshua R. Advocating The Man: Masculinity, Organized Labor, and the Household in New York, 1800–1840 (New York: Columbia University Press, 2008), 190–205.
 
 Jenkins, John Stilwell. History of the Political Parties in the State of New-York (Suburn, NY: Alden & Markham, 1846)
 Schlesinger, Arthur M., Jr. The Age of Jackson. (Boston: Little, Brown, 1953 [1945]) For a description of where the Locofocos got their name, see Chapter XV.
 
 
 Wilentz, Sean. Chants Democratic: New York City and the Rise of the American Working Class, 1788-1850 (1984).
 Wilentz, Sean. The Rise of American Democracy: Jefferson to Lincoln (2005).

External links
 

Factions in the Democratic Party (United States)
Democratic Party (United States)
1830s in the United States
1840s in the United States
Political party factions in the United States
Classical liberalism
Radicalism (historical)
Left-wing populism in the United States
Liberalism in the United States
Jacksonians